Ajñāna was one of the nāstika or "heterodox" schools of ancient Indian philosophy, and the ancient school of radical Indian skepticism. It was a Śramaṇa movement and a major rival of early Buddhism, Jainism and the Ājīvika school. They have been recorded in Buddhist and Jain texts. They held that it was impossible to obtain knowledge of metaphysical nature or ascertain the truth value of philosophical propositions; and even if knowledge was possible, it was useless and disadvantageous for final salvation. They were specialized in refutation without propagating any positive doctrine of their own. Sanjaya Belatthiputta was one of the major proponents of this school of thought.

Sources
All of our knowledge of the Ajñāna come from the Buddhists and Jain sources. The Ajñāna view points are recorded in Theravada Buddhism's Pāli Canon in the Brahmajala Sutta and Samaññaphala Sutta and in the Sūyagaḍaṃga of Jainism. Along with these texts, the sayings and opinions of the Sceptics (ajñānikāḥ, ajñānināḥ) has been preserved by Jain writer Silanka, from the ninth century, commenting on the Sutrakritanga. Silanka considers sceptics "those who claim that scepticism is best" or as "those in whom no knowledge, i.e. scepticism, is evident". Apart from the specific technical meaning, Silanka also uses the word ajñānikah in a more general sense to mean anyone who is ignorant.

Origin
The traces of scepticism can be found in Vedic sources such as in the Nasadiya hymn and hymn to sraddha (faith) in Rigveda. In Brahmanas and Early Upanishads doubt regarding a person's existence after death is cast, while the Yajñavalkya argued for the impossibility of knowing the ultimate reality or the atman. However the flourishing of sceptical thoughts seems to have occurred in a period with diverse, conflicting, and irreconcilable theories, regarding morality, metaphysics, and religious beliefs. It is natural, in the absence of a commonly accepted criterion of truth, for some people to wonder if any theory could be true at all. The Sceptics specifically pointed to the conflicting theories of atman and the requirement of omniscience, and hence the criticism of omniscience, to obtain true knowledge. A proliferation of view points existed during the period immediately preceding the rise of Buddhism, as attested in the Buddhist and Jain texts. The Buddhist Brahmajal Sutta lists four types (or schools) of Sceptics along with fifty-eight other schools of thought, while the Jain Sutrakrtanga lists sixty-seven "schools" of Sceptics among three hundred and sixty-three different schools of thought. While the list is artificially constructed according to Jain categories, the four main schools of thought, Kriyavada, Akriyavada, Ajnanikavada, and Vainayikavada, and their subgroups must have existed. Thus, philosophical Scepticism is thought to have appeared around this historic time frame.

Jain account

Existence of dissent
The Ajñāna claimed that the possibility of knowledge is doubtful since the claims to knowledge were mutually contradictory. Silanka quotes, "They posit the theory that since those who claim knowledge make mutually contradictory assertions, they cannot be stating the truth." Regarding Sceptic's point of view, Silanka in his commentary writes, as translated by Jayatilleke:

The conflicting theories of atman can be traced to Early Upanisads. The idea of atman "made of everything" (sarvamayah, idammayah adomayah) would be omnipresent (sarvagatam) (Brhadaranyaka 4.4.5) while the transcendent atman defined negatively (Brhadaranyaka 3.9.26) would not be so. Again at Katha 2.3.17 the atman is of "the size of a digit", while at Chandogya 3.14.3, the atman is "smaller than a kernel of a grain of millet". Again at Brhadaranyaka 2.3.1, Brahman which is identical with the atman is said "both to have form and also be formless." Likewise at Katha 2.3.17 the atman "resides in the heart" while at Aitareya Aranyaka 2.1.4.6 it is located in the head.

Impossibility of omniscience
In the same passage, Silanka continues:

This criticism of omniscience seems to be directed at those teachers who claimed omniscience, or to their followers who later claimed them to be omniscient, specifically the Jain leaders and Purana Kassapa, and maybe later to Makkhali Gosala and the Buddha, on the basis of which they claimed to speak with authority. The dictum, that with a limited knowledge no one can know that any person is omniscient, may possibly be an old saying of the Sceptics; and they may have extended the idea to say that since human intellect was limited, no one could claim to know everything with such limited intellect. The passage may also be seen as a critique of epistemology.

Relativity of knowledge
In the same passage, Silanka further continues:

To the Sceptics, none of the contending theories, proposed by limited intellect, can be known to be true, since they are mutually contradictory. Also, any new theory is bound to contradict existing theories, and hence cannot be true. Hence nothing can be known to be true. Thus the Sceptics conclude that the contradictions of metaphysics and the impossibility of omniscience leads them to accept Scepticism.

In a similar vein, the Sceptics held that

This may also be the reason why the Sceptics held to another dictum that

Likewise, Silanka comments, "owing to the difficulty of knowing another's mind, they do not grasp what is intended by the words of their teacher and thus repeat the other's words like a barbarian without understanding the real meaning."

Regarding this passage and the maxims on knowledge, Jayatilleke compares the Sceptic's views with that of the Greek sophist Gorgias, as given in his book "Nature or the Non-existent," and proposes that the Sceptics may have arrived at their position using similar lines of reasoning. According to Jayatilleke's interpretation of the passage given by Silanka, perception is divided into near, middle, and outer, and we perceive only the near; so each person's view of what they see of an object will be different according their perspective. Since our knowledge depends on our individual perspective, the knowledge would be subjective since different person will have differing perspectives. In the absence of objectivity, there is no knowledge and all private experiences of impressions of different individuals would be incommunicable.

Futility of knowledge 
According to Silanka,

This quotation suggests that the Sceptics preferred scepticism not just on intellectual basis, but also for pragmatic or moral reasons. What these disadvantages are, Silanka does not elaborate, but can be found in the Buddhist sources. Regarding the futility of knowledge, Silanka puts these questions of the Sceptics:

The Sutrakrtanga affirms that the Sceptics "teach final beatitude and final deliverance." Thus, the Sceptics may have contended that knowledge is not necessary for salvation but tapas, which seem similar to karmapatha.

Who knows?
Silanka in his commentary mentions sixty-seven types of Sceptics. However, these sixty-seven types are obtained combinatorially by taking nine categories (navapadartha) of Jainism, each with seven forms of predication (saptabhangakah), to give sixty-three (9 × 7) forms of sceptical questions, which were considered to represent sixty-three "types" of Sceptics asking these questions. The last four "types" were added to complete the list of sixty-seven types. However, according to Jayatilleke, these last four "types" may represent the kind of questions the Sceptics themselves might have asked. The last four questions are:
 Who knows whether there is an arising of psychological states?
 Who knows whether there is no arising of psychological states?
 Who knows whether there is and is no arising of psychological states?
 Who knows whether the arising of psychological states is impredicable?

Such psychological speculations seem to be rife during this era, as evinced in Pali Nikayas, especially the Potthapada Sutta.

Buddhist account

In the Pali texts, the Sceptics are nicknamed Amarāvikkhepikas, which translates as "eel-wrigglers," probably in reference to their "verbal jugglery." They are collectively spoken of as "some recluse and brahmins who wriggle like eels. For when a question is put to them on this or that matter, they resort to verbal jugglery and eel-wriggling on four grounds." Brahmajala Sutta describes four schools of Scepticism, the first three of whom advocated Scepticism on the basis of fear of falsehood (musavadabhaya), fear of involvement (upadanabhaya), and fear of interrogation in debate (anuyogabhaya), respectively, which all of them considered undesirable since it led to remorse or worry, and which led to a moral danger. While these three schools seem to have valued mental equanimity, it appears that the fourth school of Sceptics, associated with the philosopher Sanjaya Belatthiputta, did not share this value. A notable commonality among all these schools is the arrangement of propositions according to five-fold logic, alongside the usual two-fold mode and the four-fold mode (catuṣkoṭi) common in Pali Nikayas. The fifth mode is given as the denial of denials, that is, the rejection of the dialectician's view.

First school
The first school is described in the Brahmajala Sutta:

In the absence of adequate information, the Sceptics prudently recommend suspension of judgement. The Sceptics felt that it was not just intellectually dishonest, but also morally dangerous not to do so. 
However, according to Jayatilleke, this was probably not a temporary suspension of judgement, until new information could come by to make a better evaluation; but rather it was meant to be a permanent state of affair by outright denying the very possibility of knowledge, and hence of questions regarding morality. Thus, their Scepticism is motivated by both intellectual as well as moral reasoning (i.e. fear of asserting falsehood due to one's prejudices). They seem to have contended that knowledge was not necessary for salvation but for karma-patha.

Second School
The second school of Sceptics is described in Brahmajala Sutta in similar terms as the first, except that for them to be led to believe in a proposition by one's likes, desires, aversions, and resentments would be entanglement (upadanam), and such entanglement would be a source of worry (vighato) and as such a moral danger (antarayo). 

According to Jayatilleke, this group adopted Scepticism mainly due to morality, since to do so otherwise would lead to worry and mental disquietude (vighata), and not necessarily due to the considerations of rebirth, as understood according to the Buddhist connotation of the word "entanglement".

Third School
In Brahmajala Sutta, the third school of Scepticism is shown to put forward such arguments in support for their view point:

According to Jayatilleke, it is not clear from this passage if they wished to avoid debate because they were Sceptics or whether they adopted Scepticism because they wanted to avoid debate. According to him, it is probable that "they would have seen no point in debate since one was nowhere nearer the truth at the end of it and at the same time feared debate because it could result in loss of their mental equanimity with they valued."

Fourth School
The fourth school of Scepticism described in Brahmajala Sutta is associated with Sanjaya Belatthiputta, whose views are also recorded in the Samaññaphala Sutta, since identical language is used to describe them. Sanjaya is described as a contemporary of the Buddha, as a well-known and celebrated teacher, and as a leader of a sect who was held in high esteem by the common folk. He is said to have taught Sariputta and Moggallana, before their conversion to Buddhism. 

In Brahmajala Sutta, this fourth school of Sceptics is described as thus:

A similar account is given in the Samaññaphala Sutta. In both the accounts, the stupidity of this school is emphasised, highlighting the antipathy that the Buddhists felt about this school. In the Brahmajala Sutta, out of sixty-two philosophical schools mentioned, this school is singled out as being "a product of sheer stupidity;" whereas in the Samaññaphala Sutta, Ajatasattu singles out Sanjaya as "the most foolish and stupid."

Notable in this account of the fourth school of Scepticism is the lack of concern for good life and peace of mind, which the previous three schools regarded as desirable, and hence their advocacy of scepticism. Jayatilleke states that Sanjaya may have been a more thorough-going sceptic, to the point of being sceptical about a sceptic's way of life, and as such might have been a more vocal critic of his opponents and their regard for mental tranquillity, valued by the Buddhists as well. Judging by the propositions listed, Sanjaya's scepticism seems to have encompassed both metaphysics and morality. Sanjaya seems to grant the possibility of their truth, while denying the possibility of knowing this.

Criticisms
The Jains criticised the Sceptics by pointing out that their scepticism should lead them to the conclusion that they know nothing whatsoever, yet they assert the knowledge of their scepticism and claim to know such propositions as "ignorance is best". Silanka criticises the Sceptics' belief that one cannot know what is on another's mind, saying "the inner mind of another can be apprehended by his external features, gestures, movements, gait, speech and the changes in his eyes and face."

Influence
Although criticised by the Buddhists as amarāvikkhepikā (eel-wrigglers) in the Pali canon, the Buddha is depicted negating various the four-fold logical alternatives or catuṣkoṭi when posed with metaphysical questions, which is similar to the logic employed by the Ajñānins. However, all four schools of Ajñānins arrange their logic as five-fold formula, which seems to be based on the acceptance of the four-fold formula. This may mean that such logical schema was a common feature of the pre-Buddhist era. Alternatively, since there is no known school of Indian thinkers apart from the Buddhist who adopted a four-fold logical schema, and since all Sceptical schools are depicted to have the five-fold formula of denial, which seems to be based on the acceptance of a four-fold form of predication, this may suggest the four-fold schema to be the Buddhist invention. Indeed, two of the foremost disciples of Buddha, Sariputta and Moggallāna, were initially the students of Sanjaya; and a strong element of skepticism is found in early Buddhism, most particularly in the Aṭṭhakavagga sutra. The catuṣkoṭi was later used as a tool by Nagarjuna to formulate his influential brand of Madhyamaka philosophy. Since skepticism is a philosophical attitude and a style of philosophising rather than a position, the Ajñānins may have influenced other skeptical thinkers of India like Nagarjuna, Jayarāśi Bhaṭṭa, and Shriharsha.

According to Diogenes Laërtius, the Greek philosopher Pyrrho developed his skeptical philosophy in India when Pyrrho was there during the conquest of Alexander the Great. Based on the so-called  "Aristocles passage," Jayatilleke draws many similarities between Pyrrhonist philosophy and the Indian philosophies current at the time. In particular, he lists the following:

Scholars including  Barua, Jayatilleke, and Flintoff, contend that Pyrrho was influenced by, or at the very least agreed with, Indian scepticism rather than Buddhism or Jainism, based on the fact that he valued ataraxia, which can be translated as "freedom from worry". Jayatilleke, in particular, contends that Pyrrho may have been influenced by the first three schools of Ajñāna, since they too valued freedom from worry. If this is true, then the methods of the Ajñānins may be preserved in the extant work by the Pyrrhonist philosopher Sextus Empiricus.

See also
Āstika and nāstika
Ājīvika
Charvaka
Philosophical skepticism
Śramaṇa

Notes

Sources

Indian religions
Ancient Indian philosophy
Asceticism
Nāstika
Skepticism